Otter Creek Township is a township in Greenwood County, Kansas, USA.  As of the 2000 census, its population was 211.

Geography
According to the USGS, it contains two cemeteries: Pleasant View and Star.

The streams of North Branch Otter Creek, South Branch Otter Creek and Watson Branch run through this township.

References
 USGS Geographic Names Information System (GNIS)

External links
 US-Counties.com
 City-Data.com

Townships in Greenwood County, Kansas
Townships in Kansas